is a Japanese actor and YouTuber best remembered for his role as Kazuma Kenzaki, the protagonist in the tokusatsu series Kamen Rider Blade.

On November 9, 2016, Tsubaki was seriously beaten and injured by a motorcyclist's younger brother with a golf club on his face during an argument with the motorcyclist at 9:00 PM. However, his Kamen Rider Blade co-stars Ryoji Morimoto and Takahiro Hojo confirmed that Tsubaki's condition is in good condition the following day.

Filmography

Television
 Kamen Rider Blade (2004) as Kazuma Kenzaki/Kamen Rider Blade
 Kamen Rider Decade (2009) as Kazuma Kenzaki/Kamen Rider Blade (ep. 30-31)
 Kamen Rider Zi-O (2019) as Kazuma Kenzaki/Kamen Rider Blade (ep. 29-30)

Film
Go (2001)
 Kamen Rider Blade: Missing Ace (2004) as Kazuma Kenzaki/Kamen Rider Blade
 Master of Thunder (2006) as Tooru
 Kamen Rider × Kamen Rider W & Decade: Movie War 2010: Decade: The Last Story (2009) as Kazuma Kenzaki/Kamen Rider Blade (voice only)
 Super Hero Taisen GP: Kamen Rider 3 (2015) as Kazuma Kenzaki/Kamen Rider Blade (voice only)
 Kamen Sentai Gorider (2017) as Kazuma Kenzaki/Kamen Rider Blade

Video games
 Kamen Rider Blade as Kamen Rider Blade
 All Kamen Rider: Rider Generation 2 as Kamen Rider Blade
 Kamen Rider: Super Climax Heroes as Kamen Rider Blade
 Kamen Rider: Battride War as Kamen Rider Blade

References

External links
 Tsubaki's personal blog
 Tsubaki’s Youtube account

1982 births
Living people
Japanese male actors
Former Stardust Promotion artists